"Dirty Sticky Floors" is a song by Depeche Mode vocalist Dave Gahan from his debut studio album, Paper Monsters (2003). It was released on 26 May 2003 as the album's lead single. The song reached number 18 on the UK Singles Chart and number five on Billboard Hot Dance Club Play chart. The song was slightly remixed in two different forms for its single release and an extended version for the music video.

Background
In a VH1 interview a week after the single's release, Gahan told Jim Macnie that the song, which poked fun at his addiction, "is all about the so-called glamorous side of rock-'n'-roll, and ending up on some dirty, sticky floor every single night; some god-awful toilet in some club or – most of the time – my own dirty, sticky floor in my own bathroom."

Track listings
UK CD single (CDMUTE294)
"Dirty Sticky Floors" (radio mix, by Alan Moulder) – 3:16
"Stand Up" – 5:29
"Maybe" – 4:52

UK limited-edition CD single (LCDMUTE294)
"Dirty Sticky Floors" (Junkie XL vocal remix edit) – 7:36
"Dirty Sticky Floors" (Lexicon Avenue vocal mix edit) – 6:10
"Dirty Sticky Floors" (The Passengerz Dirty Club mix edit) – 6:11

Note: The first pressings of the limited-edition CD single incorrectly lists tracks 2 and 3 as being "Stand Up" (Lexicon Avenue vocal mix edit) and "Maybe" (The Passengerz Dirty Club mix edit) on the sleeve.

UK DVD single (DVDMUTE294)
"Dirty Sticky Floors" (video) – 3:32
"Dirty Sticky Floors" (Junkie XL dub edit) – 7:45
"Black and Blue Again" (acoustic) – 4:51

UK 12-inch single (12MUTE294) – released 9 June 2003
A. "Dirty Sticky Floors" (Junkie XL vocal remix) – 10:48
AA. "Dirty Sticky Floors" (Junkie XL dub) – 12:15

UK limited-edition 12-inch single (L12MUTE294) – released 9 June 2003
A. "Dirty Sticky Floors" (Lexicon Avenue vocal mix) – 10:31
AA. "Dirty Sticky Floors" (Silencer remix) – 6:38

US CD maxi single (42620-2)
"Dirty Sticky Floors" (radio mix, by Alan Moulder) – 3:14
"Dirty Sticky Floors" (Junkie XL vocal remix) – 10:44
"Dirty Sticky Floors" (The Passengerz Dirty Club remix) – 7:25
"Dirty Sticky Floors" (Lexicon Avenue vocal mix) – 10:31
"Dirty Sticky Floors" (Silencer remix) – 6:38
"Stand Up" – 5:28
"Maybe" – 4:52

US double 12-inch single (0-42620)
A. "Dirty Sticky Floors" (Junkie XL vocal remix) – 10:43
B1. "Dirty Sticky Floors" (The Passengerz Dirty Club remix) – 7:24
B2. "Dirty Sticky Floors" (Silencer remix) – 6:43
C. "Dirty Sticky Floors" (Junkie XL dub) – 12:14
D. "Dirty Sticky Floors" (Lexicon Avenue vocal mix) – 10:28

Credits and personnel 
 Jack Clark – mix engineering
 Jonathan Adler – recording engineering
 Mike Marsh – mastering
 Ken Thomas – mixing
 Jon Collyer – programming
 Knox Chandler – additional programming

Charts

References

External links
 Single information from the official Dave Gahan website
 AllMusic review

2003 debut singles
2003 songs
Dave Gahan songs
Mute Records singles
Songs written by Dave Gahan
Songs written by Knox Chandler